Leonard Earl Howze (born April 26, 1977) is an American actor that has been credited in over 20 movie and television roles, most notably for his role as "Dinka" in the first two films of the Barbershop trilogy,  Barbershop and Barbershop 2: Back in Business. Howze has also made notable acting appearances in the television sitcom Kevin Can Wait, Antwone Fisher, The Lone Ranger and A Thousand Words.

Acting career
Howze was born in Los Angeles, California on April 26, 1977, where he attended the Los Angeles County High School for the Arts and graduated in the class of 1995. Howze also, attended the State University of New York at Purchase and received his Bachelor of Fine Arts to begin an acting career. Howze made his acting debut as a supporting character in the 2002 blockbuster film Barbershop, where he portrays Dinka, an optimistic stereotypical African immigrant who attempts charm his crush and barber colleague, Terri played by Eve.

In the 2010's Howze continued to retain roles in the media, having roles in the films A Thousand Words starring Eddie Murphy and in the 2013 film The Lone Ranger as Homer. He appeared in multiple minor television roles as well including separate episodes of NCIS, Shameless, Legit and The League. Howze has had a recent role in 48 episodes of the television sitcom Kevin Can Wait as a supporting role. Howze says his faith in God and timing as a attribution to his commercial success and lengthy acting career.

Personal life 
Howze's hobbies when he's not acting include playing basketball, bowling and playing golf. Howze currently resides in New York during his intervals from filming.

Filmography

Film

Television

External links

References 

1977 births
Living people
Actors from California
African-American male actors
State University of New York at Purchase alumni
Male actors from Los Angeles County, California
Los Angeles County High School for the Arts alumni
Male actors from California
21st-century American male actors
American male television actors
21st-century African-American people
20th-century African-American people